Ngundi language might be:

Gundi language (Ubangian)
Ingundi language (Bantu)